William Helmick (September 6, 1817 – March 31, 1888) was an American lawyer and politician who served one term as a U.S. Representative from Ohio from 1859 to 1861.

Biography 
Born near Canton, Ohio, Helmick attended the public schools and later studied law. He was admitted to the bar in 1845 and commenced practice in New Philadelphia, Ohio. He served as prosecuting attorney of Tuscarawas County in 1851.

Helmick was elected as a Republican to the Thirty-sixth Congress (March 4, 1859 – March 3, 1861). He was an unsuccessful candidate for reelection in 1860 to the Thirty-seventh Congress.

He was appointed by President Abraham Lincoln as chief clerk of the Pension Office on May 3, 1861, and served until January 31, 1865. He then resumed the practice of law in Washington, D.C., and was later appointed Justice of the Peace by President Rutherford B. Hayes in 1877.

Death and legacy 
He died in Washington, D.C., March 31, 1888, and was interred in the Congressional Cemetery.

The Helmick Covered Bridge is named for him and is listed on the National Register of Historic Places.

Sources

1817 births
1888 deaths
Politicians from Canton, Ohio
People from New Philadelphia, Ohio
Burials at the Congressional Cemetery
County district attorneys in Ohio
19th-century American politicians
Lawyers from Canton, Ohio
19th-century American lawyers
Republican Party members of the United States House of Representatives from Ohio